Lawrence Eugene Brandt (born March 27, 1939) is an American prelate of the Catholic Church. He served as bishop of the Diocese of Greensburg in Pennsylvania from 2004 to 2015.

Biography

Early life 
Lawrence Brandt was born on March 27, 1939, in Charleston, West Virginia, the son of Lawrence E. and Priscilla (Purdy) Brandt. As a child, Brandt would pretend to celebrate the mass using a small workbench as an altar, Necco Wafers as hosts, and one of his father’s architectural manuals as the lectionary. The family later moved to Lake City, Pennsylvania, where Brandt attended St. John the Evangelist School in Girard, Pennsylvania. He then studied at the Pontifical College Josephinum in Columbus, Ohio, for high school and college courses.

Brandt travelled to Innsbruck, Austria, to study at the University of Innsbruck, obtaining his Doctor of Philosophy degree in 1966. He also completed his theological studies at the Pontifical North American College and Pontifical Gregorian University in Rome.

Priesthood 
Brandt was ordained to the priesthood by Cardinal James Aloysius Hickey for the Diocese of Erie on December 19, 1969, in St. Peter's Basilica in Rome. Brandt then attended the Pontifical Ecclesiastical Academy, and entered the Vatican Diplomatic Service in 1973, serving in Madagascar, Germany, Ecuador, and Algeria In 1974, Pope Paul VI named Brandt as chaplain of his holiness with the title of monsignor.

In 1981, Brandt left the diplomatic service for family reasons and returned to Pennsylvania. He went back to Rome in 1983 to obtain his Doctor of Canon Law degree from the Pontifical Lateran University, audited by Cardinal Tarcisio Bertone. Brandt also studied at the University of Paris in France and the University of Florence in Italy.

In 1984, Brandt was incardinated into the Diocese of Erie, where he served as vice-chancellor.  In 1985, he was appointed assistant chancellor and resident chaplain of Gannondale Residential Center for Girls, a residential facility for victims of violence and abuse.  In 1991, Brandt was named by the Vatican as honorary prelate of his holiness.  In 1998, he left Gannondale to became pastor of St. Hedwig Parish in Erie, Pennsylvania.  He later served as pastor at Christ the King Parish in Dunbar, West Virginia, and Sacred Heart Parish in Charleston, West Virginia.

Bishop of Greensburg
On January 2, 2004, Pope John Paul II appointed Brandt as the fourth bishop of the Diocese of Greensburg. He received his episcopal consecration at Blessed Sacrament Cathedral in Greensburg on March 4, 2004, from Cardinal Justin Rigali, with Bishops Anthony Bosco and Donald Trautman serving as co-consecrators. In 2010, Brandt established the Diocesan Poverty Relief Fund for direct aid to the poor in the diocese.

On June 3, 2014, Brandt and the diocese sued the U.S. Department of Health and Human Service over a provision in the Affordable Care Act that required certain religious institutions to provide contraceptive coverage in employer health insurance plans.  The suit characterized this provision as an infringement on religious liberty.

Retirement 
On July 13, 2015, Pope Francis accepted Brandt's letter of resignation as Bishop of Greensburg, to be replaced by Father Edward Malesic.

On October 10, 2019, Brandt and the Diocese of Greensburg were sued by a woman who had alleged that she had been raped beginning at age 12 by George Pierce, her parish priest, in 1972.  The suit claimed that Brandt and the diocese engaged in a conspiracy to protect Pierce.  In 2004, Brandt had sent a request to Cardinal Josef Ratzinger, head of the Congregation for the Doctrine of the Faith in Rome, to defrock Pierce.

See also
 
 Catholic Church hierarchy
 Catholic Church in the United States
 Historical list of the Catholic bishops of the United States
 List of Catholic bishops of the United States
 Lists of patriarchs, archbishops, and bishops

References

External links

Diocese of Greensburg Official Site
Diocese of Greensburg
USCCB Office of Media Relations

Episcopal succession

1939 births
Living people
Diplomats of the Holy See
Pontifical College Josephinum alumni
University of Innsbruck alumni
University of Paris alumni
University of Florence alumni
Religious leaders from Charleston, West Virginia
21st-century Roman Catholic bishops in the United States
Roman Catholic bishops of Greensburg
Pontifical North American College alumni
Pontifical Gregorian University alumni
Pontifical Ecclesiastical Academy alumni
Pontifical Lateran University alumni
Catholics from West Virginia
American expatriates in France
People from Erie County, Pennsylvania